Craig Jones  (born 17 July 1968) is a former Royal Navy Officer and LGBT rights defender in the UK armed forces. Jones was appointed Member of the Order of the British Empire in the 2006 New Years Honours List for services to Equality and Human Rights in the Armed Forces.

Early life and education 
Jones was born on 17 July 1968 in Bingley, West Yorkshire. His father was a storeman and his mother a dinner lady. He was educated at Bingley Grammar School prior to joining the University of Portsmouth.  He was a member of Southampton University Royal Naval Unit in the rank of Midshipman Royal Navy Reserves between 1986 and 1989 and trained in HMS FENCER. Mid-way through his degree studies he was offered a Commission in the Royal Navy.

Naval career 
Jones joined Britannia Royal Naval College Dartmouth in 1989 and passed out in April 1990. He completed his Fleet Time in  HMS UPTON, HMS ARIADNE and HMS ALACRITY, before joining the Fleet as a Lieutenant in HMS CORNWALL in 1992. He was the Royal Navy's first Helicopter Fast Rope Boarding Officer and led operations to clear stranded shipping from the Shatt Al Arab after the 1st Gulf War.  He was an executive officer in the border regions of Northern Ireland during "the troubles" conducting counter terrorism boardings and searches in the coastal regions.  Later he was Deputy Navigator of the aircraft carrier HMS INVINCIBLE during Operation Bolton.

After completing the Principal Warfare Officers Course, he was the Operations Officer of the Amphibious Flagship HMS FEARLESS.  In 2004 he was the Fleet Signals Intelligence Officer at Northwood HQ and his final role was at the Ministry of Defence as the Maritime Signals Intelligence Procurement Officer.  
From the day of the lifting of the gay ban on 12 January 2000 and until leaving the Service in 2008, Jones led the LGBTQ community in the British Armed Forces and  negotiated with Service Chiefs the unravelling of the impact of decades of prohibition.

Military law and homosexuality 

Homosexuality was decriminalised under the Sexual Offences Act 1967, but this did not extend to members of the armed forces where men & women serving were dishonourably discharged if their sexuality was discovered.  

Warrant Officer Robert Ely, a bandsman who joined the army at seventeen and served for twenty years before being dismissed for his homosexuality, set up Rank Outsiders in 1994 with Lt Elaine Chambers, a Queen Alexandra's Royal Army Nursing Corps nurse who had endured a harrowing dismissal from a much loved career.  Royal Navy Officer Edmund Hall later joined Rank Outsiders and set up the Armed Forces Legal Challenge Group in 1995 and is credited with winning the support of Stonewall to drive the British Government into lifting the ban.

In 1998, the campaign worked with Stonewall on behalf of Jeanette Smith, who had been thrown out of the Royal Air Force, and Duncan Lustig Prean, a Royal Navy commander who was being dismissed. They asked Stonewall to arrange legal representation, leading to a long battle through the courts with Graham Grady and John Beckett also joining the case. Although the judges in the High Court and Court of Appeal said that they felt the ban was not justified they could not overturn it and Stonewall had to take the case to Strasbourg and the European Court of Human Rights before winning it.

On 12 January 2000 the long-standing ban on homosexuals in the British Armed Forces was finally lifted.  Announcing the change to Parliament, the Secretary of State for Defence, Rt Hon Geoff Hoon acknowledge that "There will be those who would have preferred to continue to exclude homosexual, but the law is the law.  We cannot choose the decisions we implement.  The status quo is simply not an option."

Campaigner 
As the "gay ban" was lifted  Jones came out in an ill-prepared Armed Forces which had opposed the lifting of the ban for decades. By his own admission he forcefully petitioned Service Chiefs to unravel the impact of decades of prohibition, and is widely credited with driving change at a pace which was counter to the MODs intent. In 2005 the Royal Navy was the first armed service to sign up to Stonewall's Diversity Champions programme.

In 2006, then a relatively junior officer, he was exceptionally and reluctantly given leave by the MOD to speak in the United States Congress tacitly advocating for the repeal of "Don't ask, don't tell" (DADT) with members of Congress and Staffers.

Jones continued to receive criticism at the Ministry of Defence for speaking openly about the resistance of some service chiefs to change, notably about the MOD not allowing members of the armed forces to march in uniform at Pride.  In 2006 the Royal Navy was given permission to march in uniform at Pride followed by the Royal Air Force in 2007 and Army in 2008.

He returned to Washington in 2009 for discussions at Brookings as the Pentagon prepared for their own policy change. In 2008, Jones was engaged as a consultant to the Equality and Human Rights Commission during their compliance investigation of the alleged harassment of women in the Armed Forces. The enquiry found that the Armed Forces were making steady progress and working towards greater compliance.

Jones was appointed a Member of the Order of the British Empire in 2006 for services to Equality and Human Rights in the Armed Forces and completed his service career in 2008.  

To mark the 20th anniversary of the lifting of the British Armed Forces 'gay ban' Jones edited and published Fighting with Pride, a charity anthology book which brings together LGBT+  servicemen and women who have served in every conflict since WW2 to the present.  Fighting with Pride was launched as a charity, supporting LGBT+ veterans on 12 January 2020.  Minister of State for the Armed Forces, Anne-Marie Trevellyan MP read extracts from Fighting with Pride at a 20th anniversary reception at the House of Commons hosted by Johnny Mercer MP.

Jones is currently a member of the MOD Veterans Advisory and Pensions Committee.

Bibliography

References 

British gay writers
Living people
1968 births
LGBT military personnel
21st-century LGBT people